The list of ITTF World Tour (known as the ITTF Pro Tour from its inception in 1996 until 2011) is in alphabetical order by names of tournaments.


Argentina Open

Australian Open

Austrian Open

1.  Doubles events were replaced with team events.

Belarus Open

1. Doubles events were replaced with team events.

Belgium Open

Brazil Open

Bulgarian Open

Chile Open

China Open

1.  Doubles events were replaced with team events.

Chinese Taipei Open

Croatian Open

Czech Open

Danish Open

Dutch Open

Egypt Open

English Open

French Open

German Open

1.  Doubles events were replaced with team events.

Greek Open

Hungarian Open

Indian Open

Italian Open

Japan Open

1.  Doubles events were replaced with team events.

Korea Open

Kuwait Open

Lebanon Open

Malaysia Open

Morocco Open

Polish Open

Qatar Open

Russian Open

Serbian Open

Singapore Open

Spanish Open

Slovenian Open

Swedish Open

UAE Open

US Open

References

winners
Lists of table tennis players